Goodenia katabudjar is a species of flowering plant in the family Goodeniaceae and is endemic to a restricted area in the south-west of Western Australia. It is a hairy perennial sub-shrub with egg-shaped stem-leaves and blue, pink or white flowers.

Description

Taxonomy and naming
Goodenia katabudjar was first formally described in 1997 by Raymond Jeffrey Cranfield and Leigh William Sage in the journal Nuytsia from specimens collected by Sage near Wandering in 1996. The specific epithet (katabudjar) is derived from Noongar words meaning "hill" and "ground", referring to the habit of this species and its hillside habitat.

Distribution and habitat
This goodenia grows in upland areas of open wandoo woodland in the Jarrah Forest biogeographic region of south-western Western Australia.

Conservation status
Goodenia katabudjar is classified as "Priority Three" by the Government of Western Australia Department of Parks and Wildlife meaning that it is poorly known and known from only a few locations but is not under imminent threat.

References

katabudjar
Eudicots of Western Australia
Plants described in 1997
Endemic flora of Western Australia